Mahoning Township is a township in Lawrence County, Pennsylvania, United States. The population was 2,709 at the time of the 2020 census, a decline from the figure of 3,083 tabulated in 2010.

Geography
According to the United States Census Bureau, the township has a total area of 25.0 square miles (64.7 km2), of which 24.5 square miles (63.6 km2) is land and 0.4 square miles (1.2 km2), or 1.80%, is water. It contains the unincorporated communities of Hillsville, Peanut, Edinburg, North Edinburg, and Robinson.

Demographics
As of the census of 2000, there were 3,447 people, 1,373 households, and 966 families residing in the township.

The population density was 140.4 people per square mile (54.2/km2). There were 1,436 housing units at an average density of 58.5/sq mi (22.6/km2). 

The racial makeup of the township was 98.84% White, 0.29% African American, 0.12% Native American, 0.17% Asian, 0.12% from other races, and 0.46% from two or more races. Hispanic or Latino of any race were 0.35% of the population.

There were 1,373 households, out of which 31.1% had children under the age of eighteen living with them; 54.8% were married couples living together, 10.9% had a female householder with no husband present, and 29.6% were non-families. 25.9% of all households were made up of individuals, and 13.4% had someone living alone who was 65 years of age or older.

The average household size was 2.49 and the average family size was 3.00.

In the township the population was spread out, with 23.7% under the age of eighteen, 6.7% from eighteen to twenty-four, 28.8% from twenty-five to forty-four, 23.9% from forty-five to sixty-four, and 16.9% who were sixty-five years of age or older. The median age was forty years.

For every one hundred females there were 96.0 males. For every one hundred females aged eighteen and over, there were 94.7 males.

The median income for a household in the township was $32,267, and the median income for a family was $39,635. Males had a median income of $32,985 compared with that of $21,810 for females. 

The per capita income for the township was $15,878.

Roughly 8.7% of families and 10.8% of the population were living below the poverty line, including 15.0% of those under age eighteen and 9.5% of those who were aged sixty-five or over.

References

External links

Populated places established in 1793
Townships in Lawrence County, Pennsylvania